Hannastown is an unincorporated community and important historical and archaeological site located in Hempfield Township, Westmoreland County, Pennsylvania, United States.  Although the village is not tracked by the Census Bureau, it has been assigned the ZIP code 15635.

History

The village was founded in 1773 as the seat of the newly created Westmoreland County and was known as "Hanna's Town". It was located along Forbes Road, the main route into the Ohio Country from eastern Pennsylvania, and named for Robert Hanna, an early settler whose tavern also served as Westmoreland County's first courthouse. Hannastown was settled primarily by Irish and Scotch-Irish, though the surrounding area was mostly Pennsylvania Dutch.

On July 13, 1782, in one of the final actions of the American Revolution, the settlement was attacked and destroyed by a British military detachment from Fort Niagara and British-allied American Indians led by Guyasuta. The county government was moved to Newtown, later known as Greensburg. The village was rebuilt, but after Forbes Road was rerouted through Greensburg, the settlement grew little, and eventually, most of it became farmland.

In 1899, the Jamison Coal & Coke Company opened a shaft-entry coal mine at Hannastown. The site (known as No. 2) also had a coke works and nearly 80 company-built houses for employees. The Alexandria branch of the Pennsylvania Railroad served it. Production at the mine peaked in the 1910s when the site employed as many as 635 people. It ceased operations in 1949.

Historic Hanna's Town

In recent decades, what was Hanna's Town in the 1700s has been excavated, extensively restored, and rebuilt. Currently, the Historic Hanna's Town site includes the reconstructed Hanna Tavern/Courthouse, three vintage late 18th-century log houses, a reconstruction of the Revolutionary-era fort and blockhouse, a blacksmith shop, and a wagon shed housing an authentic late 18th century Conestoga wagon. The site is maintained and opened to the public by the Westmoreland County Historical Society and the Westmoreland County Parks and Recreation Department.

References

External links
 Historic Hanna's Town Westmoreland County Historical Society
 Historic Hanna's Town Westmoreland County Parks and Recreation
 $5 million Hanna's Town education center planned from Pittsburgh Post-Gazette, June 7, 2007
 History of Westmoreland County

Houses in Westmoreland County, Pennsylvania
Coal towns in Pennsylvania
Scotch-Irish American culture in Pennsylvania
Unincorporated communities in Westmoreland County, Pennsylvania
Unincorporated communities in Pennsylvania